WRCI is a radio station owned by Impact Radio and licensed to Three Rivers, Michigan. It airs Westwood One's Classic Country format under the moniker River Country 97.1.

WRCI was known as WLKM until September 18, 2008. WRCI programming is simulcast on a translator (W246BW) at 97.1 FM in Three Rivers, hence the station's moniker of "River Country 97.1." Prior to the current Classic Hit Country, WLKM operated at 1510 on the AM dial as a Music of Your Life station.

References
Michiguide.com - WRCI History

External links

RCI
Radio stations established in 1962
1962 establishments in Michigan